The escudo (Portuguese: 'shield') is a unit of currency historically used in Portugal and its colonies in South America, Asia, and Africa. It was originally worth 16 silver . The Cape Verdean escudo and the former Portuguese escudo (PTE), each subdivided into 100 , are named after the historical currency.

Other currencies named "escudo"

Circulating
Cape Verdean escudo

Obsolete
Angolan escudo
Chilean escudo
French écu
Mozambican escudo
Portuguese escudo
Portuguese Guinean escudo
Portuguese Indian escudo
Portuguese Timorese escudo
São Tomé and Príncipe escudo
Spanish escudo

References

External links
Escudo – Encyclopædia Britannica

 
Denominations (currency)